This article details the 2011–12 UEFA Champions League qualifying phase and play-off round.

All times are CEST (UTC+02:00).

Round and draw dates
All draws held at UEFA headquarters in Nyon, Switzerland.

Format
There are two routes which the teams are separated into during qualifying:
Champions Route, which includes all domestic champions which did not automatically qualify for the group stage.
League Route (also called the Non-champions Path or the Best-placed Path), which includes all non-domestic champions which did not automatically qualify for the group stage.

Each tie is played over two legs, with each team playing one leg at home. The team that has the higher aggregate score over the two legs progresses to the next round. In the event that aggregate scores finish level, the away goals rule is applied, i.e. the team that scored more goals away from home over the two legs progresses. If away goals are also equal, then 30 minutes of extra time are played, divided into two 15-minute halves. The away goals rule is again applied after extra time, i.e. if there are goals scored during extra time and the aggregate score is still level, the visiting team qualifies by virtue of more away goals scored. If no goals are scored during extra time, the tie is decided by penalty shoot-out.

In the draw for each round, teams are seeded based on their 2011 UEFA club coefficients, with the teams divided into seeded and unseeded pots. A seeded team is drawn against an unseeded team, with the order of legs in each tie decided randomly. Due to the limited time between matches, the draws for the second and third qualifying rounds take place before the results of the previous round are known. The seeding in each draw is carried out under the assumption that all of the highest-ranked clubs of the previous round are victorious. If a lower-ranked club is victorious, it simply takes the place of its defeated opponent in the next round. Prior to the draw, UEFA may form "groups" in accordance with the principles set by the Club Competitions Committee, but they are purely for convenience of the draw and do not resemble any real groupings in the sense of the competition, while ensuring that teams from the same association are not drawn against each other.

Teams
Below are the 54 teams (39 in Champions Route, 15 in League Route) involved in the qualifying phase and play-off round, grouped by their starting rounds. The 10 winners of the play-off round (5 in Champions Route, 5 in League Route) qualify for the group stage to join the 22 automatic qualifiers. The losing teams from the third qualifying round and the play-off round enter the Europa League play-off round and group stage respectively.

Champions Route

League Route

Notes

First qualifying round

Seeding

Summary

|}

Matches

Valletta won 5–1 on aggregate.

F91 Dudelange won 4–0 on aggregate.

Second qualifying round

Seeding

Notes

Summary

|}

Notes

Matches

Maccabi Haifa won 7–4 on aggregate.

Litex Lovech won 5–1 on aggregate.

Maribor won 5–1 on aggregate.

APOEL won 6–0 on aggregate.

Slovan Bratislava won 3–1 on aggregate.

Sturm Graz won 4–3 on aggregate.

Zestafoni won 3–2 on aggregate.

Dinamo Zagreb won 3–0 on aggregate.

Viktoria Plzeň won 9–1 on aggregate.

Partizan won 5–0 on aggregate.

Ekranas won 4–2 on aggregate.

Malmö won 3–1 on aggregate.

Shamrock Rovers won 1–0 on aggregate.

Rosenborg won 5–2 on aggregate.

HJK won 13–0 on aggregate.

Wisła Kraków won 3–0 on aggregate.

BATE Borisov won 3–1 on aggregate.

Third qualifying round

Seeding

Notes

Summary

|+Champions Route

|}

|+League Route

|}

Matches

Wisła Kraków won 5–2 on aggregate.

Maccabi Haifa won 3–2 on aggregate.

Dinamo Zagreb won 3–1 on aggregate.

APOEL won 2–0 on aggregate.

Copenhagen won 3–0 on aggregate.

Genk won 3–2 on aggregate.

Viktoria Plzeň won 4–2 on aggregate.

Sturm Graz won 2–1 on aggregate.

BATE Borisov won 3–1 on aggregate.

Malmö won 2–1 on aggregate.

Zürich won 2–1 on aggregate.

Twente won 2–0 on aggregate.

Benfica won 3–1 on aggregate.

Rubin Kazan won 4–1 on aggregate.

Odense won 5–4 on aggregate.

Play-off round

Seeding

Summary

|+Champions Route

|}

|+League Route

|}

Summary

APOEL won 3–2 on aggregate.

3–3 on aggregate; Genk won on penalties.

Dinamo Zagreb won 4–3 on aggregate.

Viktoria Plzeň won 5–2 on aggregate.

BATE Borisov won 3–1 on aggregate.

Villarreal won 3–1 on aggregate.

Benfica won 5–3 on aggregate.

Arsenal won 3–1 on aggregate.

Bayern Munich won 3–0 on aggregate.

Lyon won 4–2 on aggregate.

Notes

References

External links
2011–12 UEFA Champions League, UEFA.com

Qualifying Rounds
2011-12